Vicki Kirby (born 1950) is an Australian anthropologist and Professor Emeritus of Sociology and Anthropology at the University of New South Wales in Sydney.

Life 
Kirby received her BA (Hon) from Sydney University and her PhD from the University of California at Santa Cruz. In addition to numerous visiting professorships and research visits she has taught and researched in many countries, including an appointment as Erasmus Mundus professor at the University of Utrecht.

She is a founding member of the Digital Semiotics Encyclopedia Advisory Board. She is also a member of the International Editorial Advisory Board of the Borderlands Journal.

Work 
Kirby's research explores the opposites: nature / culture, body / mind, body / technology, humanities / natural sciences and their deconstruction. Kirby pursues these oppositions in terms of social and political conflicts and their effects. She sees the separation of mind and body as the basis for a number of political problems, such as climate change and gender-specific oppression. Kirby's research is significantly influenced by the work of  Jacques Derrida.

Her work is archived by Brown University as it was considered critical to feminist theory.

Judith Butler: Live Theory 
Kirby's 2006 publication, Judith Butler: Live Theory, introduces the work of feminist theorist Judith Butler. In it, Kirby examines Butler's contributions to gender theory and offers new perspectives on Butler's work, particularly on sexuality, identity, politics, language and power. She also explores  Butler's work in relation to other theorists, including Georg Wilhelm Friedrich Hegel, Simone de Beauvoir and Monique Wittig.

Publications

Monographs 

 Quantum Anthropologies: Life at Large. Durham, North Carolina: Duke University Press 2011, ISBN 978-0-8223-9444-0 .
 
Vicki Kirby (2011) Judith Butler: Pensamiento en Accion, 1st, Edicions Bellaterra, Barcelona.

Essays (selection)

References 

Living people
Academic staff of the University of New South Wales
Australian anthropologists
1950 births
University of Sydney alumni